Andrew Davis (born November 21, 1946) is an American film director, producer, writer, and cinematographer who is known for directing a number of successful action thrillers including Code of Silence, Above the Law, Under Siege, and The Fugitive.

Early life
Davis was born on the south side of Chicago, Illinois, and has directed several films using Chicago as a backdrop. He is the son of actor Nathan Davis and Metta Davis and the brother of musician Richard "Richie" Peter Davis (co-founder of the cover band Chicago Catz) and Jo Ellen Friedman. Davis used his actor father Nathan Davis to fill out many character roles throughout the years, notably as the grandfather to Shia LaBeouf's character in the Disney film, Holes.

After attending the Harand Camp of the Theater Arts summer camp program and Bowen High School. Davis went on to study journalism at the University of Illinois at Urbana-Champaign where he was issued a degree in journalism in 1968. It was not long before his interest in civil rights and anti-war issues converged with his growing interest in filmmaking. Davis was mentored by acclaimed cinematographer Haskell Wexler, with whom he worked on Medium Cool, and began his film career as a cameraman on blaxploitation films like The Hit Man, Cool Breeze and The Slams in the 1970s.

Wexler and Davis reunited in 2014 to discuss the film before a screening at the Pollock Theater on the campus of the University of California at Santa Barbara.

In October 2006, he told a London press conference that he intends to make a film fusing the novels Don Quixote by Miguel de Cervantes and Tom Jones by Henry Fielding.

Career

Davis is best known as a big-budget Hollywood filmmaker. His film The Fugitive starring Harrison Ford and Tommy Lee Jones received seven Academy Award nominations including Best Picture in 1993. Jones received a nomination and won for Best Supporting Actor that year, which is his only Oscar win to date. The Academy ultimately gave the 1993 Best Picture award to Schindler's List. That year Davis was also honored with a Golden Globe nomination for Best Director by the Hollywood Foreign Press. The Directors Guild of America nominated him for Outstanding Directorial Achievement in Theatrical Direction.

Roger Ebert reviewed The Fugitive in 1993, he begins his review with, "Andrew Davis' The Fugitive is one of the best entertainments of the year, a tense, taut and expert thriller that becomes something more than that, an allegory about an innocent man in a world prepared to crush him." Ebert observed that "Davis paints with bold visual strokes" and that he "transcends genre and shows an ability to marry action and artistry that deserves comparison with Hitchcock, yes, and also with David Lean and Carol Reed."

Early films 

His first feature film as a director was the 1978 semi-biographical picture Stony Island. The film had a theatrical release in 1978 and was eventually released on DVD on April 24, 2012. Stony Island centered on young musicians forming a band in their impoverished south side neighborhood. The film stars veteran musicians like saxophone player Gene Barge and soul singer Ronnie Barron as well as relative newcomers like Dennis Franz and Edward "Stony" Robinson. Roger Ebert describes the movie in a 2012 article, "The energy, I gather, came in large part from the performers themselves. The movie is more or less based on fact; the director and co-writer, Andy Davis, has a brother who was the last white kid on the block down on Stony Island, and actually was involved in a band something like the one in the movie."

In 1981 Davis directed a slasher film titled The Final Terror, which was released in 1983. The film was produced by Joe Roth and features several early performances from stars like Rachel Ward, Daryl Hannah, and Joe Pantoliano, among others. Davis co-wrote a screenplay for a Harry Belafonte project Beat Street which was a rap musical featuring breakdancing and the street music culture of early eighties New York City. Mike Medavoy and Orion Pictures tapped Davis to direct the Chuck Norris vehicle, Code of Silence.

In 1986 Davis was hired as the director of The Running Man, starring Arnold Schwarzenegger, but eventually got replaced by Paul Michael Glaser one week into filming.

Davis co-wrote, produced and directed a film titled Above the Law for Warner Brothers in 1988. This film is most notable for being the feature film debut of Steven Seagal. Davis then went back to Orion with his project The Package, working with Gene Hackman and Tommy Lee Jones.

1990s 

Davis brought Jones with him to his next project, which was originally titled Dreadnaught but eventually carried the title Under Siege. In the picture Davis re-teamed with Seagal to create the top grossing fall film of 1992.

Davis continued directing big budget adventures throughout the 1990s including The Fugitive, starring Harrison Ford and Tommy Lee Jones; Steal Big Steal Little featuring Alan Arkin and Andy Garcia in a dual role playing opposite himself as twin brothers; Chain Reaction with Keanu Reeves, Morgan Freeman and Rachel Weisz, and A Perfect Murder, starring Gwyneth Paltrow, Michael Douglas, and Viggo Mortensen.

2000s to present 
In the fall of 2001, Davis was set to release Warner Brother's Collateral Damage starring Arnold Schwarzenegger. However, the initial release date was pushed in an effort to be sensitive to the tragedies of 9/11, as the film's plot and content too closely echoed the tragedy. The film was finally released theatrically in 2002.

In 2003 Davis developed Holes for the Walt Disney Company starring Shia LaBeouf, Sigourney Weaver, Patricia Arquette, Tim Blake Nelson, Jon Voight. Louis Sachar and Davis developed the script based on Sachar's Newbery Medal and National Book Award-winning children's novel. A.O. Scott's review in The New York Times (written in April) called it "the best film released by an American studio so far this year".

Davis filmed the Disney/Touchstone feature film, The Guardian in 2006. The film focuses on the Rescue Swimmers of the U.S. Coast Guard and stars Kevin Costner and Ashton Kutcher. Costner plays a legendary rescue swimmer who returns to the training facility to bring up the next generation of swimmers, including a rescue swimmer played by Kutcher. Production was halted when the film's New Orleans location was ravaged by Hurricane Katrina. The real-life Coast Guard advisers on the film were immediately deployed to rescue victims of the storm.

Presently, Davis is developing several projects through his Santa Barbara based production company, Chicago Pacific Entertainment, including: Silvers Gold - A Return to Treasure Island, a modern retelling of Robert Louis Stevenson's classic, set in the forgotten bayous of post Katrina Louisiana, a thrilling action-adventure quest for the long-lost fortune of one of America's most infamous rascal heroes, the pirate Jean Lafitte. Mentors, a series for worldwide television and streaming distribution. The pilot examines the lives of two legendary photographers. Davis is also writing with novelist Jeff Biggers the screenplay and novel for Civil Defense, a geo-political thriller involving the world threatening discovery of rogue weapons found in Southern Illinois by a Chicago detective and young female archaeologist.

Filmography
 1978: At Home with Shields and Yarnell
 1978: Stony Island
 1983: The Final Terror
 1985: Code of Silence
 1988: Above the Law
 1989: The Package
 1992: Under Siege
 1993: The Fugitive
 1995: Steal Big Steal Little
 1996: Chain Reaction
 1998: A Perfect Murder
 2002: Collateral Damage
 2003: Holes
 2005: Just Legal
 2006: The Guardian
 2019: Mentors - Tony & Santi

Davis received nominations for Golden Globe and DGA awards in the Best Director category for his work on The Fugitive.

References

External links
 
 Andrew Davis website www.andrewdavisfilms.com

1946 births
American film directors
Film producers from Illinois
American people of Romanian-Jewish descent
Living people
Writers from Chicago
University of Illinois Urbana-Champaign College of Media alumni
Action film directors